The Holly Springs Disaster was a Canadian metalcore band formed in 2005 in Moose Jaw, Saskatchewan.

History
They toured Canada numerous times to support their self-released Home Alone EP before collaborating with producer Zach Ohren to record their debut album, Motion Sickness Love. The band’s album was released on September 18, 2007 by Canadian label Underground Operations. After the album release THSD did a cross-country tour (Tour and Loathing) with Protest the Hero and All That Remains. Tour and Loathing marked the band's first time stopping to play east coast dates. The Holly Springs Disaster recently debuted new material when they played The Reverb during Canadian Music Week 2008.  At the end of 2008 the band supported Cancer Bats on their Canadian dates and in early 2009 The Holly Springs Diasaster did some headlining dates across Canada with A Textbook Tragedy, Baptized in Blood, Sights & Sounds and more.

Departure of Michael Froh
On April 6, 2009, the band posted a blog on their MySpace page saying that the lead singer, Mike, had decided to leave the band he didn't have the same goals for the band as the rest of them. 
It has also been stated in a blog on his personal MySpace that other factors, such as health issues, and a loss of confidence in the record industry caused him to leave the group.
The band spent some time looking for a replacement and recorded some instrumental songs that they've put up on their MySpace.

Break-up

The band announced their break-up and played a final farewell tour across Canada in the summer of 2010 with Structures and Architects.

The band posted to their Facebook on July 23, 2014, that they would return in 2014. Three days later, they announced a reunion show in Toronto, Ontario, for December 19 and 20 at the Danforth Music Hall with supporting bands Structures (19th/20th), Ritual ex. Dead and Divine (19th), and Exalt (20th).

Members

Current members
Michael Froh - lead vocals (2005–2009; 2010; 2014) 
Tony Davalos - guitar, vocals (2005–2010; 2014)
Andy Foord - bass (2005–2010; 2014)
Dan Marranca - drums (2007–2010; 2014)
Josh Guillaume - guitar, vocals (2005–2010; 2014)

Former members
Joel Hansen - drums (2005–2007)

Discography

Albums
Unreleased (2008)
Motion Sickness Love (2007)

EPs
The Home Alone (2006)

Other
 King Kong (instrumental)
 Road Rash (instrumental)

Videography
"Up in Smoke", music video from Motion Sickness Love (2007)

References

External links
The Holly Springs Disaster at ChartAttack
The Holly Springs Disaster on MySpace
The Holly Springs Disaster on PureVolume
The Holly Springs Disaster interviewed by WGTS Magazine

Musical groups established in 2006
Musical groups disestablished in 2010
Musical groups from Saskatchewan
Moose Jaw
Canadian metalcore musical groups
2006 establishments in Saskatchewan
2010 disestablishments in Canada